Brittany Starr Bowe (born February 24, 1988) is an American speed skater and former inline skater and basketball player. She has eight gold, one silver, and two bronze medals from the world inline speedskating championships. From her junior years, she has another 21 world championship medals. She also has a gold medal from the combined sprint event in roller skating at the 2007 Pan American Games.

In speed skating, she has specialized in the 500, 1000 and 1500 meters, and she won the bronze medal on the 1000 meters distance in the 2013 World Single Distance Championships. In the 2015 World Single Distance Championships, she won the gold medal on the same distance, as well as another gold medal in the 1500 meters, and the silver medal in the 500 meters. Two weeks later, she also won the 2015 World Sprint Championships, winning all four races along the way. She has two bronze medals, from the 2018 and 2022 Olympics.

For her performance in the 1000 metres competition of the Single Distance Championships, Bowe was awarded the 2015 Oscar Mathisen Award.

Bowe is the current world record holder on the 1000 meters distance, and has previously held the 1500 metres world record, on which distance she holds the American record.

Early life
Bowe was born in Ocala, Florida, to Michael and Deborah Bowe (née Starr), and grew up practicing several sports from an early age, including basketball and soccer. At the age of 2, she would give dribbling exhibitions at halftime of college basketball games. Though making it to a statewide under-13 boys travel team in soccer, she gave that sport up, because of overlapping seasons with basketball.

She attended the Trinity Catholic High School in Ocala, and then Florida Atlantic University in Boca Raton, where she played basketball for the Florida Atlantic Owls. She graduated in 2010, majoring in sociology and social science. Bowe has shared that she is a lesbian.

Inline speed skating

In 1996, at the age of 8, Bowe tried inline skating. She competed at increasingly higher levels, ultimately participating in world championships from 2002 to 2008, where she won 32 medals altogether, 11 of which came in senior championships.

Basketball
After the 2008 world championships in inline speed skating, Bowe focused on her basketball game, playing as a point guard for the Florida Atlantic Owls.

Florida Atlantic statistics
Source

Speed skating

Watching friends from the inline years, such as Chad Hedrick and Heather Richardson, participating in the 2010 Winter Olympics, Bowe decided to pause her basketball career, and moved to Salt Lake City in 2010 to take up speed skating.

She soon enjoyed success, and on January 19 and 20, 2013, she earned her first podium placings in the ISU Speed Skating World Cup, finishing third in both races over the 1000 metres distance at the World Cup stop in Calgary, Alberta, Canada. Six weeks later, on March 3, she won her first World Cup gold medal in the 1000 metres at the World Cup stop in Erfurt, Germany. Overall, she finished second in the women's 1000 metres World Cup, after Heather Richardson.

On March 23, 2013, Bowe won her first world championship medal in speed skating, a bronze, in the women's 1000 metres distance of the World Single Distance Championships, finishing behind Olga Fatkulina of Russia and Ireen Wüst of the Netherlands.

On November 17, 2013, Bowe set a new world record on 1000 meters with a time of 1:12.58 in the World Cup stop in Salt Lake City. Over the 2013–14 World Cup season, she collected a total of five podium placings in the 1000 metres World Cup, one gold, three silver, and one bronze medal, for an overall silver medal, behind Heather Richardson. In the 1500 metres World Cup, Bowe collected one gold, one silver, and one bronze medal, for an overall bronze medal, behind Dutch skaters Ireen Wüst and Lotte van Beek.

The 2014 Winter Olympics in Sochi, Russia, was somewhat of a disappointment, with Bowe finishing 13th in the 500 metres, 8th in the 1000 metres, and 14th in the 1500 metres.

In the 2015 World Single Distance Championships, she won gold medals in the 1000 and 1500 meters, and a silver in the 500 meters. She also won the 2015 World Sprint Championships.

Over the 2014–15 World Cup season, Bowe collected four podium placings, three silver and one bronze, for an overall 5th place in the 500 metres World Cup, five podium placings, three gold and two silver, for an overall win in 1000 metres World Cup, and three podium placings, one gold and two silver, for an overall bronze medal in the 1500 metres World Cup.

Records

Personal records

World records

Results timeline

References

External links

1988 births
Living people
American female speed skaters
American roller skaters
Inline speed skaters
Olympic bronze medalists for the United States in speed skating
Speed skaters at the 2014 Winter Olympics
Speed skaters at the 2018 Winter Olympics
Speed skaters at the 2022 Winter Olympics
Medalists at the 2018 Winter Olympics
Medalists at the 2022 Winter Olympics
Pan American Games medalists in roller skating
Pan American Games gold medalists for the United States
Roller speed skaters at the 2007 Pan American Games
Florida Atlantic University alumni
Florida Atlantic Owls women's basketball players
Sportspeople from Ocala, Florida
Basketball players from Florida
World Sprint Speed Skating Championships medalists
World Single Distances Speed Skating Championships medalists
Point guards
Medalists at the 2007 Pan American Games
American women's basketball players
Lesbian sportswomen
American LGBT sportspeople
LGBT basketball players
LGBT speed skaters
LGBT people from Florida
20th-century American women
21st-century American women